Conestoga College Institute of Technology and Advanced Learning is a public college located in Kitchener, Ontario, Canada. Established in 1967, Conestoga serves approximately 23,000 registered students through campuses and training centres in Kitchener, Waterloo, Cambridge, Guelph, Stratford, Ingersoll and Brantford with an enrolment of 11,000 full-time students, 30,000 part-time students, and 3,300 apprenticeship students.

History
The college was founded in 1967 as the Conestoga College of Applied Arts and Technology, one of many such institutions established in that time by the Ontario government to grant diplomas and certificates in career-related, skills-oriented programs. It was renamed in 2012 when the government extended the school's reach, namely to grant degrees in technology-based fields.

Over the years, it has added programs such as the Master of Business Administration program, in cooperation with the University of Windsor. In addition, the college offers a new nursing curriculum leading to a Bachelor of Science in Nursing (B.Sc.N.) degree. Students accepted to Conestoga's Nursing Program take all four years of study at the Doon Campus in Kitchener. Graduates of the program will receive a degree from McMaster University.

Beginning in August 2003, two new programs began which would be the first to award a degree to students entirely through the college. These are the B.Eng. Mechanical Systems Engineering program, a fully accredited engineering program by Engineers Canada, and the B.A.Tech Architecture - Project and Facility Management In 2007 a third B.A. Tech in Integrated Telecommunication and Computer Technology degree program was added, targeting embedded system hardware and software design and manufacture. All three programs award a Bachelor of Applied Technology degree. At the beginning of 2005 a new Bachelor of Applied Health Sciences Degree in Health Informatics Management program was started in the School of Health Sciences, Community Services, and Biotechnology.

In 2006, the college purchased the former University Heights Secondary School in Waterloo for nearly $6,000,000, into which its Waterloo campus relocated later that year from 435 King Street North. The property is significantly larger than its former Waterloo campus, which the college will sell to cover the cost of the purchase.

Academic program
Conestoga has one, two, three, or four-year programs, as well as apprenticeship training programs. There are also many options available to students including four-year degrees in Mechanical Systems Engineering, Integrated Telecommunications and Computer Technology, Architecture, Health Informatics or the International Business Management degree which started in the fall of 2006. Conestoga also has several agreements with Ontario universities including Wilfrid Laurier University, University of Windsor, and McMaster University, as well as several other Canadian and international institutions.

Conestoga College has a variety of diploma programs, degree programs, and other academic programs taught by highly educated professors. Conestoga College has a number of women professors who teach courses, giving opportunities for both men and women to work as professors in the academic workforce.

Conestoga College offers a full-time program for students who wish to work in the field of Early Childhood Education, this diploma program has changed the way women are seen in the Early Learning and Care field. After graduating the two-year program, students are eligible to register to be members of the College of Early Childhood Educators, which allows them to pursue a job in that field. The program is also offered as part time, allowing students who aren't able to attend full-time to still have the opportunity to obtain an ECE diploma.

The Bachelors of Early Learning Program Development was introduced to Conestoga as a four-year degree program, ECE students who have successfully graduated have the opportunity to bridge into this degree program, allowing them to obtain their degree in only two years.

Conestoga College is committed to supporting parents and children, the Family Literacy Facilitation Program is a program that is designed to give students knowledge and skill to be able to successfully support their child's literacy skills. This program usually brings in mothers and child care students who wish to learn more about literacy.

Trades and apprenticeship
The college operates trades programs at the campuses in Kitchener, Waterloo, Cambridge and Guelph; training facilities are operated in Brantford and Ingersoll. The school's programs include Construction, Motive Power, Industrial and Service sectors, as well as Traditional Apprenticeship and, most recently, Pre-apprenticeship, offered in partnership with private enterprise companies. The college's president  revealed a plan in late 2019 to consolidate all of the trades programs at one location in future, but the date of the move was not disclosed at that time.

Campuses

Doon Campus is the main campus for Conestoga College. It is located at the south end of Kitchener and houses the central administration offices as well as the majority of courses offered by the college. Regional campuses have select programs.

Doon Campus - Main Campus, 299 Doon Valley Drive, Kitchener, Ontario, N2G 4M4

Kitchener Downtown Campus, 25 Frederick Street, Kitchener, Ontario, N2H 6M8

Waterloo Campus, 108 University Avenue East, Waterloo, Ontario N2J 2W2

Cambridge Campus, 850 Fountain Street South, Cambridge, Ontario N3H 0A8

Guelph Campus, 460 Speedvale Avenue West, Guelph, Ontario N1H 6N6

Stratford Campus, 130 Youngs Street, Stratford, Ontario N5A 1J7

Brantford Campus, 50 Wellington Street, Brantford, Ontario N3T 2L6

Cambridge Downtown - Academic Upgrading, Suite 402, 150 Main Street, Cambridge, Ontario N1R 6P9

Ingersoll Skills Training Centre, 420 Thomas Street, Ingersoll, Ontario N5C 3J7

Cambridge - Reuter Drive Campus , 25 Reuter Drive, Cambridge, Ontario N3E 1A9

Planned Milton Campus
The town of Milton, Ontario and Wilfrid Laurier University had been working together since 2008 to develop the 150-acre campus in Milton within the planned Milton Education Village (MEV) on 150 acres of land donated by the town. The university subsequently partnered with Conestoga College which would also add a satellite campus at that location.

In April 2018, the Province announced a funding plan of $90 million for the project. Construction of the 150-acre campus was expected to conclude in Q3 of 2021; in the meantime, the college would offer courses in rented premises, commencing in September 2019.

In October 2018, however, the new provincial government (elected in June 2018) withdrew the funding before any construction had begun, citing a greater than expected provincial deficit. This effectively cancelled the plans for the joint project with Laurier. Mayor Gord Krantz said the town would explore alternatives for funding the Milton Education Village campus. A news release issued by the college said that it would continue working with Laurier, "the government, industry and community partners to develop a revised model for the cost-effective delivery of post-secondary education ... in Milton..."

Cambridge expansion
The college decided to purchase 42 acres of land in this city in 2019, to relocate all of the trades programs (offered at various campuses) to Cambridge at a future date. Specifics were not immediately provided at the time of the announcement in late 2019. The new campus opened in Fall 2022 on 40 acres of land at Reuter Drive, next to Highway 401. The college aims to modernize and consolidate all skilled trades programs in this single location.

Planned Guelph expansion
The college has operated a small campus in Guelph for some years, but in late 2019, it advised the news media that a major expansion was planned after the trades program was relocated to Cambridge. "Within five or six years, we will have at least 5,000 students there ... [with] full-service programming," said college President John Tibbits. At the time, the Guelph campus had approximately 1,000 students.

Other buildings

Recreation Centre
ATS Centre
Woodworking Centre of Ontario

Future
The School of Engineering and Information Technology was relocated, in 2011, to a new expansion of the Doon campus opposite the current facility across Highway 401. This City of Cambridge site will eventually hold  of space.

Phase one of the new Cambridge Campus was finished and open for the start of the fall 2011 semester. This first 260,000 square-foot building is home to the School of Engineering and Information Technology, as well as to the Institute for Food Processing Technology. The Engineering facility has programs with a focus on advanced manufacturing, robotics, renewable energy, telecommunications, and information technology. The food processing industry is continuing to grow and this expansion will help fill a need for current and future skilled workers in this sector. The expansion has increased capacity by 2,350 additional full-time spaces and allowed for an additional 800 new spaces for apprentices.

In May 2019, a new downtown campus for the International Business program was announced to be opening at Kitchener's Market Square in January 2020. It will host 1,000 students to start.

Student Life Centre

Student media
88.3 CJIQ is the college's campus radio station. It is used as part of the Broadcasting: Radio course and Journalism program. Local radio DJ Jeremy James got his start at this station.
Spoke On-line is the web version of the official newspaper of Conestoga College. Student reporters in the Journalism programs contribute the news and editorial content of the paper, and are responsible for the production of the weekly publication.
519 Online News is an online newsroom in Waterloo Region staffed by students in the Videography-Broadcast Journalism/Documentary graduate program in the School of Media and Design.
Conestoga Connected is a weekly half-hour newsmagazine all about Conestoga College student programs, news, events, innovations, sports, life off-campus and alumni. It is created and produced by second-year Broadcast Television students.

Student sports
Conestoga College student sports teams are named the "Condors". They compete against varsity level teams. There are also intramural and extramural programs.

Student committees 
In 2002 Conestoga College was given the ability to grant degrees to students. Shortly after that, the Student Degree Committee was formed. Students who are registered in four year degree programs may join the Degree Committee. Their participation contributes to their co-curricular record, and allows them to be a part of planning and hosting social events for all degree students in order to foster degree culture at Conestoga College. The Student Degree Committee is supervised by women staff from Conestoga College.

Student services 
Conestoga College has a wide range of generations that attend classes. Some students attend right after graduating high school and others attend at a much later time in their lives. Some are parents. The on-site Doon Childcare Centre offers programs for infants, toddlers, and preschoolers.

Conestoga offers multiple services/resources to help support families, such as food banks, counseling services, and medical services for students without a family doctor. 

Conestoga College wants to ensure all students are feeling supported and safe on campus and in their home environments. A number of counseling services are offered, and a sexual violence and gender-based violence prevention program is available.

"A Place of New Beginnings" provides services for Aboriginal students at Conestoga College, including those who are First Nations (status and non-status), Métis and Inuit. It is a warm, welcoming and comfortable environment that assists students with a smooth transition to college life by providing ongoing student support.

On-campus jobs 
A number of services offered at the college require employees, and an on-campus student hiring procedure allows students to work. A number of facilities at the college also provide job opportunities for the community.

Notable alumni
 Vic Fedeli, advertising executive and Ontario politician
 Will Ferguson, Ontario politician and Cabinet member
 Barry Greenwald, whose 1975 student film Metamorphosis at Conestoga College won the Short Film Palme d'Or at the Cannes Film Festival
 Brenda Halloran, RN and Mayor of Waterloo
 Brenda Irving, CBC Television sports journalist
 Jonny Staub, radio and television personality
 Elizabeth Wettlaufer, serial killer and former registered nurse

See also
 Higher education in Ontario
 List of colleges in Ontario

References

External links

 

 
Educational institutions established in 1967
Colleges in Ontario
1967 establishments in Ontario